Poveri ma belli (U.S. title: Poor, But Handsome; U.K. title: A Girl in Bikini) is a 1957 Italian comedy film directed by Dino Risi.

There have been two sequels, also directed by Risi and starring Marisa Allasio, Maurizio Arena and Renato Salvatori: Belle ma povere in 1957 and Poveri milionari in 1959 (the latter not featuring Allasio, who by then had retired from acting).

Plot
Romolo (Maurizio Arena) and Salvatore (Renato Salvatori) are two young men that are neighbors and friends. They live with their parents in Piazza Navona in Rome. They are poor but handsome, and both fall in love with the beautiful Giovanna (Marisa Allasio).

After having briefly flirted in quick succession with both friends (a situation which severely strains their feelings of comradeship), Giovanna realizes she's still in love with Ugo, her previous boyfriend, and returns with him. Romolo and Salvatore, their friendship recovered, ultimately get simultaneously engaged with each other's sister.

Cast
 Marisa Allasio: Giovanna
 Maurizio Arena: Romolo
 Renato Salvatori: Salvatore
 Lorella De Luca: Marisa
 Alessandra Panaro: Anna Maria
 Memmo Carotenuto: Alvaro
 Mario Carotenuto: Uncle Mario
 Virgilio Riento: father of Giovanna
 Ettore Manni: Ugo
 Rossella Como: Ugo's current girlfriend
 Aldo Valletti
 Nino Vingelli
 Erminio Spalla

External links 
 

1957 films
1950s Italian-language films
Italian black-and-white films
Films set in Italy
Films set in Rome
Films shot in Rome
Films directed by Dino Risi
Titanus films
1957 romantic comedy films
Italian romantic comedy films
1950s Italian films